Randy Renfrow (born January 28, 1958) is an American former stock car racing driver. He raced many years in the NASCAR Craftsman Truck Series before retiring. Renfrow has won 237 late model races at 40 different tracks over his career.

Nextel Cup Series
Renfrow attempted numerous races in early 2002, all for Price Motorsports. However, Renfrow only made one race. He would start and finish 43rd (last) on the spring field at Richmond. He only competed 58 laps in that race before retiring due to oil pump failure.

Craftsman Truck Series
Renfrow started his CTS career in 1996, running seven races. His debut came for the #41 George Turnage Dodge team at Bristol. He started the race in 15th position, but finished 27th after mechanical issues. In fact, Renfrow would only finish one race in 1996, a race at Richmond in which he would finish 12th. It would prove to be his only top-20 finish on the year. However, Renfrow qualified well. He had two top-10 starts, the best being a 5th at Nashville.

Renfrow competed in two races in 1997 for the Turnage team. He was 32nd at Bristol and 24th at Richmond, both without very much to comment on. He did not finish either race.

Renfrow began 1998 running Dominic Dobson's #78 Dodge. In his first race at California, Renfrow qualified 4th. Renfrow then led his first career CTS laps at Pikes Peak, leading ten laps before fuel issues forced him out. He would also lead nine laps at Loudon, but the results were not there and Renfrow left the team. He drove the #61 IWX Chevy at Martinsville in his next start. There, he drove a solid race to 9th place. It was his first career CTS top 10. The run earned Renfrow a run in the #66 Ford for two races, and then the #84 Ford for the season finale. However, for those two teams, his best race was 26th at Vegas and neither ride resulted in a 1999 offer. Overall, he finished 30th in points.

Renfrow would once again finish 30th in points during 1999. He started off his season by replacing the injured Rick Carelli in his #6 RE/MAX Chevy. However, in three starts, Renfrow only managed a best finish of 15th at I-70, before Carelli came back. Renfrow then moved back to the #41 Dodge, now owned by TKO Motorsports. He ran solidly in his six starts for that team. In his first start for the team, he started on the outside pole at Michigan, before finishing 26th. After that, he had five straight top-20 finishes to close out the year. This included a 9th at Richmond, matching his career best.

The late season for TKO earned Renfrow the full ride in 2000. In fourteen starts for the team, Renfrow managed four top-10s. This included his first career top-5 and eventual best career finish of fifth at Mesa Marin. Oddly, after the race at Milwaukee, Renfrow was released in favor of Jamie McMurray. Renfrow was 15th at that time in points, but only raced one more time in 2000. That was for Conely Motorsports at Texas, where he finished 30th.

Renfrow returned to the series for three races in 2003. He drove the #66 MLB Motorsports Dodge in all three starts. However, the team was low-budget and the best Renfrow managed was 25th at Dover, even though he did not finish that race or any other of his 2003 starts.

Renfrow has not raced in major NASCAR since. He continues to race Late Model cars occasionally at Wake County Speedway (Raleigh, N.C.), owns Randy Renfrow Race Cars, and is a crew chief in late model racing for Coulter Motorsports.

Motorsports career results

NASCAR
(key) (Bold - Pole position awarded by qualifying time. Italics - Pole position earned by points standings or practice time. * – Most laps led.)

Winston Cup Series

Daytona 500

Craftsman Truck Series

External links
 

Living people
1958 births
People from Wilson, North Carolina
Racing drivers from North Carolina
NASCAR drivers
CARS Tour drivers